A Ramsar site is a wetland site designated to be of international importance under the Ramsar Convention, also known as "The Convention on Wetlands",  an intergovernmental environmental treaty established on 2nd February 1971 in Ramsar, Iran by UNESCO, which came into force from 21st December,1975. It provides for national action and international cooperation regarding the conservation of wetlands, and wise sustainable use of their resources. Ramsar identifies wetlands of international importance, especially those providing waterfowl habitat.

As of August 2022, there are 2,471 Ramsar sites around the world, protecting , and 171 national governments are participating.

Site listings
Ramsar sites are recorded on the List of Ramsar Wetlands of International Importance. 

The non-profit organisation Wetlands International provides access to the Ramsar database via the Ramsar Sites Information Service.

Ramsar site criteria
A wetland can be considered internationally important if any of the following nine criteria apply:

 Criterion 1: "it contains a representative, rare, or unique example of a natural or near-natural wetland type found within the appropriate biogeographic region."
 Criterion 2: "it supports vulnerable, endangered, or critically endangered species or threatened ecological communities."
 Criterion 3: "it supports populations of plant and/or animal species important for maintaining the biological diversity of a particular biogeographic region."
 Criterion 4: "it supports plant and/or animal species at a critical stage in their life cycles, or provides refuge during adverse conditions."
 Criterion 5: "it regularly supports 20,000 or more waterbirds."
 Criterion 6: "it regularly supports 1% of the individuals in a population of one species or subspecies of waterbird."
 Criterion 7: "it supports a significant proportion of indigenous fish subspecies, species or families, life-history stages, species interactions and/or populations that are representative of wetland benefits and/or values and thereby contributes to global biological diversity."
 Criterion 8: "it is an important source of food for fishes, spawning ground, nursery and/or migration path on which fish stocks, either within the wetland or elsewhere, depend."
 Criterion 9: "it regularly supports 1% of the individuals in a population of one species or subspecies of wetland-dependent non-avian animal species."

Classification

The Ramsar Classification System for Wetland Type is a wetland classification developed within the Ramsar Convention intended as a means for fast identification of the main types of wetlands for the purposes of the Convention.

Marine/coastal wetlands
 Saline water:
 Permanent:
 (A) Permanent shallow marine waters: Less than 6m deep at low tide; including sea bays and straits
 (B) Marine subtidal aquatic beds: Underwater vegetation; including kelp beds and sea grass beds, and tropical marine meadows
 (C) Coral reefs
 Shores:
 (D) Rocky marine shores
 (E) Sand, shingle or pebble shores
 Saline or brackish water:
Intertidal:
 (G) Intertidal mud, sand or salt flats
 (H) Intertidal marshes
 (I) Intertidal forested wetlands
 Lagoons:
 (J) Coastal brackish/saline lagoons
 Estuarine waters: 
 (F) Estuarine waters
 Saline, brackish, or fresh water:
 Subterranean: 
 (Zk(a)) Karst and other Subterranean hydrological systems
 Fresh water:
 Lagoons: 
 (K) Coastal freshwater lagoons

Inland wetlands
 Fresh water:
 Flowing water:
 Permanent:
 Permanent inland river deltas (L)
 Permanent rivers/creeks/streams (M)
 Freshwater springs, oases (Y)
 Seasonal/intermittent rivers/creeks/streams (N)
 Lakes/pools:
 Permanent >8 ha (O)
 Permanent < 8 ha(Tp)
 Seasonal / Intermittent > 8 ha (P)
 Seasonal Intermittent < 8 ha(Ts)
 Marshes on inorganic soils:
 Permanent (herb dominated) (Tp)
 Permanent / Seasonal / Intermittent (shrub dominated)(W)
 Permanent / Seasonal / Intermittent (tree dominated) (Xf)
 Seasonal/intermittent (herb dominated) (Ts)
 Marshes on peat soils:
 Permanent (non-forested)(U)
 Permanent (forested)(Xp)
 Marshes on inorganic or peat soils:
 Marshes on inorganic or peat soils / High altitude (alpine) (Va)
 Marshes on inorganic or peat soils / Tundra (Vt)
 Saline, brackish or alkaline waters:
 Lakes
 Permanent (Q)
 Seasonal/intermittent (R)
 Marshes/pools
 Permanent (Sp)
 Seasonal/intermittent (Ss)
 Fresh, saline, brackish or alkaline waters:
 Geothermal (Zg)
 Subterranean (Zk(b))

Human-made wetlands
 (1): Aquaculture ponds
 (2): Ponds (farm and stock ponds, small stock tanks, or area less than 8 ha)
 (3): Irrigated land
 (4): Seasonally flooded agricultural land
 (5): Salt exploitation sites
 (6): Water Storage areas/Reservoirs
 (7): Excavations 
 (8): Wastewater treatment areas
 (9):  Canals and drainage channels or ditches
 (Zk(c)): human-made karst and other subterranean hydrological systems

See also
 List of parties to the Ramsar Convention
 Montreux Record

References

External links
 Ramsar Sites Information Service.org: Official List of all Ramsar Sites website—via Ramsar Sites Information Service
 Ramsar Sites Information Service.org—images of Ramsar sites
 Ramsar.org: Ramsar Convention website

 
1975 in the environment
Protected areas established in 1975
Protected areas
Sites
Wetland conservation
Wetlands
Wildlife conservation